Klyavlino is a rural locality (a railway station) and the administrative center of Klyavlinsky District, Samara Oblast, Russia. Population:

References

Notes

Sources

Rural localities in Samara Oblast